is a Japanese tokusatsu TV show and is the 14th show in the Ultra Series. Featuring  Chiaki J. Konaka as series composer and produced by Tsuburaya Productions and Mainichi Broadcasting System (MBS TV), Ultraman Gaia was aired on JNN TV stations (TBS, CBC, MBS, etc.) from September 5, 1998 until August 28, 1999, with a total of 51 episodes.

Overview
Ultraman Gaia takes place in yet another universe, one that is different from the world of the Shōwa era Ultramen (Ultraman to Ultraman 80), as well as the world of Ultraman Tiga and Ultraman Dyna. In a departure from most of the other series, there are two Ultramen as the main characters. They have conflicting philosophies in regards to defending Earth from a mysterious, malevolent and extremely intelligent cosmic entity.

The first half of the series explores the growing tension between them and their eventual clash. The second half has them reconcile their differences so they can defeat their common enemy.

The show is also different from past Ultra Series installments in that the support team, XIG, has more personnel than the defence teams in previous installments.

In this series, Ultraman Gaia is the lead, but Ultraman Agul is prominently focused on as well. They are often at odds with each other at the beginning of the series. Their philosophies are as different as their skin colors. Unlike Gaia, Agul is completely blue. Gamu Takayama, the human host of Ultraman Gaia, believes that Gaia is here to save Earth and humanity. On the other hand, Hiroya Fujimiya, the human host of Ultraman Agul, believes Agul to be Earth's natural defense mechanism. He is at first more interested in protecting just the planet itself, even at the expense of humanity (hence the occasional clashes with Gaia). However, this was discontinued after Gaia and Agul would work together as one to face more powerful monsters.

Story

The story takes place in the year 2000. Chrisis, a supercomputer developed the Alchemy Stars (a global network of young geniuses born during the 1980s), predicts around 1996–1997 that Earth and humanity would be annihilated by something known as the "Radical Destruction Bringer". Technology developed by the Alchemy Stars is used to form an international defence organization known as Geocentric Universal Alliance against the Radical Destruction (G.U.A.R.D.). This is done secretly, so as to avoid causing a worldwide panic. The eXpanded Interceptive Guards (X.I.G.) is the combat wing of G.U.A.R.D, operating in a floating sky fortress known as the Aerial Base.

Gamu Takayama, a 20-year-old scientist and member of the Alchemy Stars, briefly encounters Gaia during some virtual reality experiments he performs with the secret purpose of discovering the will of the Earth, later merging with him in order to fight various monsters that threaten the safety of the Earth. During his battles, he encounters Ultraman Agul, whose human host is Hiroya Fujimiya, a former Alchemy Stars member. Both clash because of their ideals regarding the protection of the Earth but eventually resolve their differences to battle their common enemy.

Episodes

Other media

Films and team ups

 Ultraman Tiga & Ultraman Dyna & Ultraman Gaia: Battle in Hyperspace (1999), Gaia is one of the main Ultramen to appear in this movie, alongside Tiga and Dyna.
Ultraman Gaia: Gaia Again (2001), A 45-minute Original Video Tokusatsu release (or OVT) set several years after the end of the series. Ultraman Gaia and Ultraman Agul return to fight a new enemy, along with help from mysterious undersea creatures.
Superior Ultraman 8 Brothers (2008), Gaia teams up with Tiga, Dyna and Mebius in this movie, alongside Showa-era Ultra Heroes.
Ultraman Ginga S: Showdown! Ultra 10 Warriors!! (2015), Ultraman Gaia is one of the Heisei-era Ultra Heroes to fight along with other 9 Heisei-era Ultra Heroes.
Ultraman Orb: The Origin Saga (2016-2017), Ultraman Gaia and Ultraman Agul return to fight the Bezelbs where it approaches the Earth, along with help from Ultraman Orb, Dyna and Cosmos starting on the eighth episode. The planet Earth in this show is not the one from Ultraman Gaia, as there are no mention of Gaia and Agul's names by its residents.

Video games
Although not technically an Ultraman game, Ultraman Gaia serves as both the main character and main plot in Banpresto's Super Hero Operations: Diedal's Ambition for the PlayStation.

Cast
: 
: 
: 
: 
: 
: 
: 
: 
: 
: 
: 
: 
: 
: 
: 
:  (Played by )
: 
: 
: 
: 
: 
: 
: 
: 
: 
: 
: 
: 
: 
:  (Played by 久野 真紀子)
: 
: 
:  (Played by )
: 
: 
: 
: 
: 
: 
: 
: 
Narration:

Music
Opening theme 
"Ultraman Gaia!" by  & 
Ending themes
"Lovin' You Lovin' Me" by B.B. WAVES
"Beat on Dream on" by 
Insertion songs
"LOVE IS ALIVE" by Sudo Hitomi 
"Gaia No Chikara" by Tanaka Masayuki & Daimon Kazuya
"Blue rose" by Kikuta Tomohiko

Home media
In 2016, the series was released on Crunchyroll and later released on the streaming service Toku in 2018.

In July 2020, Shout! Factory announced to have struck a multi-year deal with Alliance Entertainment and Mill Creek, with the blessings of Tsuburaya and Indigo, that granted them the exclusive SVOD and AVOD digital rights to the Ultra series and films (1,100 TV episodes and 20 films) acquired by Mill Creek the previous year. Ultraman Gaia, amongst other titles, will stream in the United States and Canada through Shout! Factory TV and Tokushoutsu.

References

External links
Tsuburaya Productions - The Official Home of Ultraman (Japanese)
Japan Hero - Webpage devoted to Japanese superheroes

1998 Japanese television series debuts
1999 Japanese television series endings
Ultra television series
TBS Television (Japan) original programming
Mainichi Broadcasting System original programming
Television duos